Milan Kolena (born May 12, 1994) is a Slovak ice hockey centre. He is currently playing for the Sheffield Steeldogs of the National Ice Hockey League in the United Kingdom.

Kolena previously played nine games in the Kontinental Hockey League for HC Slovan Bratislava and also played in the Slovak Extraliga for MHC Martin, HC Košice, MsHK Žilina and ŠHK 37 Piešťany.

He moved to the United Kingdom in 2016, signing for the Telford Tigers.

Career statistics

International

External links

1994 births
Living people
HC Slovan Bratislava players
HC Košice players
MHC Martin players
ŠHK 37 Piešťany players
Slovak ice hockey centres
Telford Tigers players
MsHK Žilina players
Sportspeople from Martin, Slovakia
Expatriate ice hockey players in England
Slovak expatriate sportspeople in England
Slovak expatriate ice hockey people